Standing Silent Nation is a 2006 documentary film about Alex White Plume, a resident of South Dakota's Pine Ridge Reservation. After a great deal of research, Alex and his family planted industrial hemp, under the incorrect assumption that tribal sovereignty laws would allow the production of this non-psychoactive relative of marijuana, and the film details the consequences of his actions.

Standing Silent Nation was directed by Suree Towfighnia and aired as part of PBS's Point of View series in 2007.

Project funders
Standing Silent Nation is made possible with the support of Native American Public Telecommunications, the Paul Robeson Fund for Independent Media, the Playboy Foundation, and many others who have donated to the project over the years.

Awards
The documentary was awarded Red Nation Film Festival awards for  Best Director, Best Producer, and Best Documentary in 2009.

References

External links 
 
 P.O.V. Standing Silent Nation - PBS's site dedicated to the film
 

2006 films
Documentary films about agriculture in the United States
Hemp
Lakota culture
Documentary films about Native Americans
POV (TV series) films
Documentary films about indigenous rights
Documentary films about cannabis
2006 documentary films
Cannabis on American Indian reservations
Cannabis in South Dakota
American films about cannabis
Native Americans in South Dakota
2000s English-language films
2000s American films